DYKC (675 AM) Radyo Ronda is a radio station owned and operated by Radio Philippines Network. The station's studio is located at RPN Compound, M.L. Quezon St., Maguikay, Mandaue City, while its transmitter is located at Brgy. Kalunasan, Cebu City. Established in 1972, DYKC is the pioneer AM radio station in Cebu.

References

Radio Philippines Network
DYKC
Radio stations established in 1972
News and talk radio stations in the Philippines